Anelosimus nelsoni is a species of spider in the family Theridiidae. It is only known from iSimangaliso Wetland Park, KwaZulu-Natal, South Africa. It is named for Nelson Mandela. Both the holotype and paratype were found on Fanies Island, 5 km south of Cape Vidal. Both were collected from bushes or trees in an open forest patch.

See also 
 Stasimopus mandelai, another spider named after Nelson Mandela
 List of organisms named after famous people (born 1900–1949)

References 

Endemic fauna of South Africa
Theridiidae
Spiders of South Africa
Spiders described in 2006
Nelson Mandela